The 2021–22 season was the 116th season in the existence of Olympique de Marseille and the club's 26th consecutive season in the top flight of French football. In addition to the domestic league, Marseille participated in this season's editions of the Coupe de France, the UEFA Europa League and the UEFA Europa Conference League.

Players

First-team squad

Out on loan

Transfers

In

Out

Pre-season and friendlies

Competitions

Overall record

Ligue 1

League table

Results summary

Results by round

Matches
The league fixtures were announced on 25 June 2021.

Coupe de France

UEFA Europa League

Group stage

The draw for the group stage was held on 27 August 2021.

UEFA Europa Conference League

Knockout phase

Knockout round play-offs
The draw for the knockout round play-offs was held on 13 December 2021.

Round of 16
The round of 16 draw was held on 25 February 2022.

Quarter-finals
The draw for the quarter-finals was held on 18 March 2022.

Semi-finals
The draw for the semi-finals was held on 18 March 2022, after the quarter-final draw.

Statistics

Appearances and goals

|-
! colspan=14 style=background:#dcdcdc; text-align:center| Goalkeepers

|-
! colspan=14 style=background:#dcdcdc; text-align:center| Defenders

|-
! colspan=14 style=background:#dcdcdc; text-align:center| Midfielders

|-
! colspan=14 style=background:#dcdcdc; text-align:center| Forwards

|-
! colspan=14 style=background:#dcdcdc; text-align:center| Players transferred out during the season

Goalscorers

Notes

References

Olympique de Marseille seasons
Marseille
2021–22 UEFA Europa League participants seasons